Francis Bardanouve (December 10, 1917 – March 17, 2002) was an American politician in the state of Montana who served in the Montana House of Representatives from 1958 to 1994. He was Speaker pro tempore in 1975. Serving for 36 years, he is the second longest serving member of the Montana legislature.

References

1917 births
2002 deaths
People from Blaine County, Montana
Ranchers from Montana
Democratic Party members of the Montana House of Representatives
20th-century American politicians